The 2006 Sun Belt Conference men's basketball tournament took place March 3–7, 2006. The tournament took place in Murfreesboro, TN at the Murphy Center on the campus of Middle Tennessee State University. The Semifinals were televised on ESPN Plus with the Championship game being televised on ESPN2.

Bracket

References

Tournament
Sun Belt Conference men's basketball tournament
Sun Belt Conference men's basketball tournament
Sun Belt Conference men's basketball tournament
College sports tournaments in Tennessee